The Denver Mountain Parks system contains more than  of parklands in the mountains and foothills of Jefferson, Clear Creek, Douglas, and Grand counties in Colorado, west and south of Denver.

Owned and maintained by the City and County of Denver, this historic system was launched in 1910 and required Congressional approval in 1914 for the city to purchase federal lands outside its municipal limits. The mountain parks system was created “for the purpose of assuring perpetually to the residents of Denver the sublime scenery of the Rockies, the preservation of native forests and having for all time a pleasure ground in the mountains for the thousands of annual visitors to the city easily accessible.” 

The Denver Mountain Parks system currently consists of 22 developed parks and other undeveloped parklands that serve as open space, scenic viewsheds, and wildlife habitat. It ranges in elevation from 5,800 to 13,000 ft above sea level. Many of the parks have picnic areas and some have trails. J.J.B. Benedict designed many of the pavilions and shelters in these parks, using native stone and timber to create a “mountain architecture” style that blends into the natural sites. Two shelters, one in Genesee Park and one in Dedisse Park, were built in the late 1930s by the Civilian Conservation Corps.

The Denver Mountain Park properties encompass a variety of habitats, including prairie, mountain meadow, riparian forests, montane (ponderosa pine, Douglas-fir) and subalpine (Engelmann spruce) forests, and alpine tundra. Bison herds were established in wildlife preserves at Genesee Park in 1914 and later in Daniels Park as part of an effort to recover this species extirpated from Colorado.

History
Beginning in about 1909-10, the idea of a mountain park in the foothills west of Denver was promoted by John Brisben Walker and Denver's Mayor Robert W. Speer. Walker approached the Denver Real Estate Exchange, the Denver Chamber of Commerce, and the Denver Motor Club, and each of these appointed a committee to evaluate the idea. Later these were formed into a "Joint Committee of the Commercial Bodies." A city election in May 1912 gave voter approval to a mill levy to support the project.

In 1912, Frederick Law Olmsted, Jr. was hired to plan the park system. Olmsted identified 41,310 acres (167 km²) of land that Denver should acquire for parks, mountain roads, and to protect scenic vistas. Acquisition of Genesee Park began in 1912; it was the first park established and, at 2,413 acres (9.7 km²), is still the largest. The last new parks were Red Rocks Park, purchased in 1927-28; O'Fallon Park and Newton Park, donated in 1939; and Winter Park, purchased in 1939. Daniels Park was also expanded at that time.

The major parks in the system were designated to the National Register of Historic Places in 1990 and 1995 as a result of multiple-property submissions that ultimately included sixteen parks. Two of the highways originally built by Denver in 1912-1914, the Bear Creek Canyon Scenic Mountain Drive and the Lariat Trail Scenic Mountain Drive, were also included in that designation. These drives today are part of the Lariat Loop Scenic & Historic Byway. The designated parks are listed at National Register of Historic Places listings in Jefferson County, Colorado.

Despite their historical significance, dedicated funding for the parks was eliminated in 1955 when they became part of the Denver Parks and Recreation Department. After that time, the parks were relatively neglected, a situation that led to the formation of the Denver Mountain Parks Foundation as an advocacy group in 2004. In 2008, the Foundation and the Department joined forces to create a Master Plan for the system, the first since the original Olmsted Plan. The Plan "examines the value of the Mountain Parks to the people of Denver; provides sustainable management strategies for the funding, marketing, and protection of the currently underfunded system; and proposes both large and small improvements for the next 5-20+ years, to take this system to a level of quality commensurate with its international status." For the plan, a new logo (above) was commissioned from artist Michael Schwab to help create an identity for the park system.

In 2013, the Denver Mountain Parks Foundation and the City of Denver marked the centennial of the park system with a book featuring park history, scenic and historic photographs, and a guide to the system. Denver Mountain Parks: 100 Years of the Magnificent Dream was released August 1, 2013, by John Fielder Publishing.

List of Mountain Parks
Properties owned by the City & County of Denver as Mountain Parks vary in degree of development and use. Some familiar parks are well known and regularly visited (Red Rocks Park, Echo Lake, for example); others are remote or small parcels that receive less use (Pence Park, Turkey Creek Park). Most parks have picnic areas and restrooms, but in some cases in this list, "developed" may refer only to accessibility, e.g., Bear Creek Canyon and Deer Creek Canyon. A few park names are duplicated in Jefferson County Open Space parks.

References

Further reading
1918. What the City has done in Five Years to Bring Wilderness Charm to the Masses. Municipal Facts (monthly). Vol. 1 No. 1. (and numerous other articles published in Municipal Facts 1912-1928)
1990. Multiple Property Documentation Form, 1990. Retrieved 2012-03-10. 
1995. Denver Mountain Park System, multiple property submission to National Register of Historic Places.
2004. Noel, Thomas J. Sacred Stones: Colorado's Red Rocks Park and Amphitheatre.  City & County of Denver, Division of Theatres & Arenas
2008. Denver Mountain Parks Master Plan. Denver Parks & Recreation Department. 156 pp, plus appendices.
2013. Rex-Atzet, Wendy, Sally L. White, and Erika D. Walker. Denver Mountain Parks: 100 Years of the Magnificent Dream.  Denver Mountain Parks Foundation. John Fielder Publishing. 144 pp.

External links
Denver Mountain Parks web portal (links to official City pages)
Denver Mountain Parks Foundation
Denver Mountain Parks History Pages
Lariat Loop Scenic & Historic Byway
2008 Master Plan
History of Denver Mountain Parks

 
Parks on the National Register of Historic Places in Colorado
Protected areas of Jefferson County, Colorado
Protected areas of Clear Creek County, Colorado
Protected areas of Douglas County, Colorado
Protected areas of Grand County, Colorado
National Register of Historic Places in Grand County, Colorado
1910 establishments in Colorado
Parks in Denver